Robert Emmet is a bronze statue of Robert Emmet by Jerome Connor. There are four examples: Massachusetts Avenue and 24th Street, N.W. Washington, D.C.; St Stephen's Green, Dublin; Golden Gate Park, San Francisco; Emmetsburg, Iowa.

The San Francisco example was dedicated on July 20, 1919.
The Washington example  was cast in 1916, and was dedicated on June 28, 1917. It was rededicated on April 22, 1966. The statue was a gift to the Smithsonian Institution on loan to the National Park Service.

The inscription reads:
(On right side of bronze base of sculpture:)
JEROME CONNOR
1916
(Front of stone base:)
Robert Emmet
Irish Patriot
1778–1803
"Lidia-saon-eine"
(On plaque, back of base:)
"I WISHED TO PROCURE FOR MY
COUNTRY THE GUARANTEE WHICH
WASHINGTON PROCURED FOR AMERICA
I HAVE PARTED FROM EVERYTHING
THAT WAS DEAR TO ME IN THIS LIFE
FOR MY COUNTRY'S CAUSE
WHEN MY COUNTRY TAKES HER PLACE
AMONG THE NATIONS OF THE
EARTH, THEN, AND NOT TILL THEN
LET MY EPITAPH BE WRITTEN"
Extracts from Emmet's speech
from the dock September 19, 1803

See also
 List of public art in Washington, D.C., Ward 2

References

External links
 

1916 sculptures
1917 establishments in Washington, D.C.
1919 establishments in California
Artworks in the collection of the National Park Service
Bronze sculptures in California
Bronze sculptures in Washington, D.C.
Sculptures of the Smithsonian Institution
Emmet
Monuments and memorials in California
Monuments and memorials in Iowa
Monuments and memorials in Ireland
Monuments and memorials in Washington, D.C.
Outdoor sculptures in Ireland
Outdoor sculptures in San Francisco
Outdoor sculptures in Washington, D.C.
Sculptures of men in California
Sculptures of men in Iowa
Sculptures of men in Ireland
Sculptures of men in Washington, D.C.
Statues in San Francisco
Statues in Iowa
Statues in Ireland
Statues in Washington, D.C.
Golden Gate Park